Jack Renfrey Tame (born March 1987) is a television and radio journalist and presenter. He is the host of TVNZ’s political show Q+A, and a presenter at Newstalk ZB.

Early life
Tame was born in Christchurch, New Zealand, the son of Golden Bay High School principal Linda Tame and John Tame who worked in accountancy when Jack and his three siblings were growing up. He is the eldest of the four siblings.

Tame attended St Martin's Primary School in Christchurch and then Cashmere High School before graduating from the New Zealand Broadcasting School at CPIT (now Ara Institute of Canterbury).

Career
Tame previously worked as the United States correspondent for TVNZ, based in New York City, and is the former co-host of Breakfast. He is the Saturday morning host on radio station Newstalk ZB, current host of Q+A since April 2019, and a columnist for the Herald on Sunday. He currently works in two roles for Newstalk ZB: Saturday morning presenter (9 am to 12 pm) and Mike Hosking Breakfast'' fill-in presenter (weekdays, 6–9 am).

See also
 List of New Zealand television personalities

References

External links 
 
 
 Jack Tame at NZ On Screen

New Zealand television presenters
Living people
Newstalk ZB
1987 births
People from Christchurch
People educated at Cashmere High School